Heston's Fantastical Food is a television cookery program starring chef Heston Blumenthal which broadcast on Channel 4 in the UK during late 2012. The programme follows Blumenthal as he supersizes a variety of food for presentation to members of the public.

Description

The premise of the show was for Heston Blumenthal, chef-patron of the Michelin starred restaurants The Fat Duck, Dinner by Heston Blumenthal and The Hinds Head, to supersize a variety of food on themed episodes in order to excite the public. These challenges included creating a pub out of pies which included an arch made from pastry, and a cone which would hold one tonne of ice cream. A variety of research was conducted by the research team behind the programme, which included proving that biscuits tasted better after they had been dunked in tea.

The show was produced by production company Betty TV for Channel 4, with the titles and bumpers designed by Pete&Tom, and theme music by Ben Parsons. Channel 4 were sold on the premise of a world record attempt in each episode.

Reception
The first episode of Heston's Fantastical Food had two million viewers on Channel 4, beating Dara Ó Briain's Science Club, the first episode of which was broadcast at the same time on BBC Two.

John Crace of The Guardian thought that Heston's Fantastical Food was too similar to his previous Channel 4 outings, describing him as a "flatscreen one-trick wonder". He felt that the show had been padded out from twenty minutes to an hour and found it conceited that Blumenthal was doing something useful. Tim Dowling reviewed the second episode, also for The Guardian saying that "Heston's mission suffered from a woolliness of intent that made it hard to justify the grandeur of the project". Benji Wilson of The Daily Telegraph gave the show 2/5 stars, and said that the "show is messy and mildly repellent because it asks us to take food, both the cooking and the eating of it, seriously, yet it does so with a series of glib stunts". The Metro was equally critical in its review, saying that it "came across as a self-indulgent game", and that it "was more of a bizarre bid to get in the Guinness World Records book than anything you might call cooking". However it described the Christmas episode as something which "promises to be fun".

Episodes

References

External links
Official website

Episode list using the default LineColor
Channel 4 original programming
2012 British television series debuts
British cooking television shows